Whitefish Lake may refer to:

Settlements
Whitefish Lake 6, Ontario, a reserve in Ontario, Canada inhabited by the Ojibwa Whitefish Lake First Nation.

Lakes

Canada
Whitefish Lake (British Columbia), a lake in northern British Columbia
Whitefish Lake (Merrill Creek), a lake in the Moira River and Lake Ontario drainage basins, in Ontario
Whitefish Lake (Thunder Bay District), a lake in Thunder Bay District in northwestern Ontario
Whitefish Lake (Manitoba), a lake in Manitoba

United States
Whitefish Lake (Minnesota), a lake in Crow Wing County, Minnesota
Whitefish Lake (Montana), a lake in Flathead County, Montana
Whitefish Lake or maar, part of the Espenberg volcanic field in Alaska

See also
Whitefish (disambiguation)
Lake whitefish